Legal education in the United Kingdom is divided between the common law system of England and Wales and Northern Ireland, and that of Scotland, which uses a hybrid of common law and civil law.

The Universities of Dundee, Glasgow and Strathclyde,  in Scotland, are the only universities in the UK to offer a dual-qualifying degree. Dundee also offers a choice of either English/Northern Irish or Scots Law separate LL.B. degrees. Aberdeen offers a "Law with English Law" course in which Scots Law and English Law is taught.

England, Wales and Northern Ireland 

Requirements for becoming a lawyer in England and Wales and in Northern Ireland differ slightly depending on whether the individual plans to become a solicitor or barrister. All prospective lawyers must first however possess a qualifying law degree, or have completed a conversion course. A qualifying law degree in England and Wales must contain modules covering the following subject areas:

 Public law (constitutional/administrative)
 European Union law
 Criminal law
 Law of obligations (contract, restitution, and tort)
 Property law (real property)
 Trusts and equity

Following graduation, the paths towards qualification as a solicitor or barrister diverge. Prospective solicitors must enroll with the Law Society of England and Wales as a student member and take a one-year course called the Legal Practice Course (LPC), usually followed by two years' apprenticeship, known as a training contract. Prospective barristers must first apply to join one of the four Inns of Court and then complete the one-year Bar Professional Training Course (BPTC), followed by a year training in a set of barristers' chambers, known as pupillage.

Qualifying law degrees

England

 Anglia Ruskin University
 Arden University
 Aston University
 University of Bedfordshire
 University of Birmingham
 Birmingham City University
 University of Bolton
 Bournemouth University
 University of Bradford
 Bradford College
 Brunel University London
 University of Buckingham
 BPP Law School
 University of Brighton
 University of Bristol
 Bristol Law School, University of the West of England, Bristol
 Faculty of Law, University of Cambridge
 Canterbury Christ Church University
 University of Central Lancashire
 University of Chester
 Coventry University
 De Montfort University
 University of Derby
 Durham Law School at Durham University
 UEA Law School at the University of East Anglia
 School of Law and Social Sciences, University of East London
 Edge Hill University
 University of Essex
 University of Exeter
 University of Gloucestershire
 University of Greenwich
 University of Hertfordshire
 University of Huddersfield
 University of Hull
 Keele University
 University of Kent
 Kingston University
 Lancaster University
 University of Leeds
 Leeds Law School, Leeds Beckett University
 University of Leicester
 University of Lincoln
 University of Liverpool
 Liverpool John Moores University
 University of London:
Birkbeck, University of London
City Law School at the City, University of London
The Dickson Poon School of Law, King's College London
London School of Economics
Royal Holloway, University of London
Queen Mary, University of London
School of Oriental and African Studies (SOAS)
UCL Faculty of Laws, University College London
University of London International Programmes
 London Metropolitan University
 University of Manchester
 Manchester Law School at Manchester Metropolitan University
 Middlesex University
 Newcastle University
 New College of the Humanities
 University of Northampton
 Northumbria University*
 University of Nottingham
 Nottingham Law School at Nottingham Trent University
 Open University
 Oxford Brookes University
 Faculty of Law, University of Oxford
 Pearson College London
 Plymouth University
 University of Portsmouth
 University of Reading
 University of Salford
 University of Sheffield
 Sheffield Hallam University
 Southampton Solent University
 London South Bank University
 University of Southampton
 Staffordshire University
 University of Sunderland
 University of Surrey
 University of Sussex
 Teesside University
 University of Warwick
 University of West London
 University of Westminster
 University of Winchester
 University of Wolverhampton
 University of York
 York St John University
 University of Law

Northern Ireland
 Queen's University Belfast
 Ulster University

Scotland 
 University of Dundee School of Law
 University of Strathclyde Law School
 University of Aberdeen School of Law
 University of Glasgow School of Law

Wales
 Aberystwyth University
 Bangor University
 Cardiff University
 University of South Wales
 Swansea University

*Northumbria offers an 'exempting degree' in which the LPC or BVC is combined with the qualifying law degree into a four-year course

Scotland 
When the kingdoms of England and Scotland merged to form the Kingdom of Great Britain in 1707, the terms of the 1706 Treaty of Union that led to the union guaranteed that Scotland's legal system would continue, separate from that of England and Wales.

Scots law is founded upon Roman or civil law, although today it has evolved into a pluralistic system, using both civil and common law. As in England and Wales, lawyers in Scotland are divided into two groups: solicitors and advocates. Solicitors are members of the Law Society of Scotland, and are only entitled to practise in the lower courts of Scotland, while advocates are members of the Faculty of Advocates and are permitted to appear in the superior High Court of Justiciary and Court of Session. Membership of either (but only one) body can be attained either by sitting that body's professional exams, or by obtaining exemption through the award of a qualifying law degree and successful completion of the Diploma in Legal Practice.

The Diploma in Legal Practice trains students on the practical elements of being a lawyer in Scotland, and consists of a broad range of compulsory modules.

After completion of the diploma, students wishing to become solicitors undertake a two-year traineeship with a law firm, before being admitted as full members of the Law Society. To become an advocate, students undertake a period of training of twenty-one months with a solicitor, before a further nine month unpaid traineeship with an experienced advocate, known as devilling.

Scottish solicitors and advocates are entitled to practise elsewhere in the European Union, provided that they satisfy the requirements of the relevant EU directives. However, to practise elsewhere in the United Kingdom, further courses and examinations are required.

Schools of law
The following institutions offer qualifying degrees of Bachelor of Laws (LL.B.). Those offering the Diploma in Legal Practice are marked with an asterisk (*):

University of Aberdeen School of Law*
Abertay University Division of Law
University of Dundee School of Law*
University of Edinburgh Law School*
Edinburgh Napier University
University of Glasgow School of Law*
Glasgow Caledonian University
Robert Gordon University Law School*
University of Stirling
University of Strathclyde Law School*

Alternatives to an (initial) law degree 
In England and Wales there are also one year conversion courses known as the Common Professional Examination (CPE) or Graduate Diploma in Law (GDL), for non-law graduates as an alternative to the full-length LL.B. degree course, whilst a number of institutions also offer two-year conversion courses, usually at a lower cost with a more distinguished qualification, such as a master's degree.

Scots law regulations usually require a full LL.B qualification. It is possible to complete an honours degree in any other subject, whether in Scotland or elsewhere, and subsequently undertake a qualifying accelerated two-year LL.B. (which is essentially the first two years of the honours LLB) at several universities including Aberdeen, Caledonian, Dundee, Edinburgh, Glasgow, Strathclyde and Stirling.

See also 
Legal education

References

Further reading 
 

 
United Kingdom